Mother's Cake are an Austrian psychedelic space rock band.

History 
In November 2008 Yves Krismer (guitar, vocals), Benedikt Trenkwalder (Bass) and Jan Haußels (Drums) met first to jam in Arzl im Pitztal, a small village in the Tyrolean Alps and hometown of Yves Krismer. Not long after that, they founded the band Mother's Cake. Their music is influenced by different bands like The Mars Volta, Red Hot Chili Peppers, Led Zeppelin or Bootsy Collins. They play a mixture of funk, hard rock and progressive, psychedelic parts.

They started playing gigs in the western parts of Tyrol and also in its capital Innsbruck. In 2009 they entered their first big band contest with about 1.000 participating bands – the International Live Award feat. Austrian Band Contest 2010. They clearly won both preliminary rounds for Tyrol and Vorarlberg as favourites of the official judges. Despite of being the judges' favourites at the finals in Vienna they only came in third.

At the beginning of 2010 they participated in the Local Heroes Austria 2010 Band Contest. They won the two preliminary rounds and the final round of the western Austrian states Vorarlberg, Tyrol and  Salzburg as the judges' explicit favourites. Finally, on May 29, 2010, they won the Austrian finals in Vienna. They were not only awarded for being the best band of the contest, but each band member separately for their musical achievements as best singer, best bass player and best drummer of the competition.

On August 18, 2010 GoTV – the Austrian music TV channel – aired one hour of 'hosted by Mother‘s Cake' and the music video to 'Realitricked Me' was first shown in public. The EP was published on September 1, 2010. 

On November 26, 2010, they participated at the European finals of the Local Heroes 2010 Band Contest in Pécs/Hungary. They competed against the Local Heroes finalists of Germany, Hungary and Italy and the finalists of different contests all over Europe. In the end, Mother's Cake came in second after the Danish band Rufus Spencer.

The director Henning Backhaus, a student of Michael Haneke, used a couple of their songs for the soundtrack of his film "Local Heroes" and even involved the band at the shooting. The film is about the upsurge of a young band, just like Mother's Cake. The film was premiered at the 62. Berlin International Film Festival from February 9 to 19 2012. Their debut “Creation’s Finest” (release-date: 26-10-2012) was produced by Georg Gabler and got featured by Ikey Owens († 2014, member of The Mars Volta & Jack White). Creation’s Finest created a big stir in national and international music press and ensured Mother’s Cake a firm stand in the business.

The first single “Soul Prison” (17-08-2012) reached over 400,000 views on Youtube.

In 2013, they got awarded with the “Austrian Newcomer Award″ and played many sold-out shows including support gigs for Iggy and the Stooges, Living Colour,  Omar Rodriguez Lopez Group, Deftones and Tito & Tarantula.

The “Endless Space Tour 2014″ led them to Australia in February 2014. They band was welcomed cordially in Down Under and successfully played 12 shows in 2 weeks. On April 4, Mother’s Cake released their debut in Germany, played a tour there and announced their new video project.

“Off The Beaten Track” presents itself as a 45-minutes long movie that features a whole live-set of Mother’s Cake. It was funded successfully through a crowd-funding project and was officially released on July 17, 2014.

In fall 2014, Mother’s Cake supported Anathema on their Distant Satellites tour leading through 20 countries playing 42 shows in 56 days.

Their second studio album “Love The Filth” released on June 5, 2015, via the new founded label Panta R&E including the single “Gojira“. Again the reviews were positive. Subsequently Mother’s Cake was announced as support of Limp Bizkit on four shows, one of them in London.

In 2016, Mother’s Cake headlined again in Germany, recorded their 3rd studio album and went on tour with Bobby Liebling‘s Pentagram and Wolfmother.

On January 27, 2017, they released No Rhyme No Reason via Membran Media/The Orchard and showcased at Eurosonic Noorderslag in Groningen, The Netherlands. Sold out shows followed in Melbourne, Brisbane and Sydney at a 7- dates-tour through Australia. Until April the band played 44 shows in Australia, Germany, Austria and Switzerland with 11 sold out shows. A special highlight was the tour’s ending in Vienna with 800 people at the Arena and another 38 shows were booked for the following fall.

In 2018, the heavy touring mode was kept up and  the band played more than 100 shows in  UK, Romania, Hungary, Germany, Croatia, Bulgaria, Austria and Switzerland. Additionally, they performed two shows at the Great Escape in Brighton and one at Liverpool’s Soundcity, which was followed by the nomination for the Austrian Amadeus Award in the category “Hard & Heavy”. In July, the band was invited to play 4 Shows with Alice in Chains. On September 17, Mother’s Cake released their 2nd live album Live at Bergisel via Membran/The Orchard /SONY, where they recorded the whole album in the famous Austrian skijumping arena in Innsbruck and also videos documenting the event.

In January 2019, the band played their first shows in India at the Humming Tree in Bangalore and the Sula Fest near Mumbai.

Pre-history
Yves Krismer and Benedikt Trenkwalder already succeeded with their Band Brainwashed. They came second at the Austrian Band Contest 2005 and released two albums. They played as supporting band for Velvet Revolver, Tito & Tarantula, Le Tigre and others.

Members
Yves Krismer - vocals, guitar (2008-present)
Benedikt Trenkwalder - bass (2008-present)
Jan Haußels - drums (2008-present)

Discography

Albums 
 Creation's Finest (2012)
 Off the Beaten Track (2014; live album)
 Love the Filth (2015)
 No Rhyme No Reason (2017)
 Live at Bergisel (2018)
 Cyberfunk! (2020)

 EPs 
 Mother's Cake'' (2010)

Singles 
 "The Killer" (2016)
 "Black Roses" (2017)
 "Obey the Machine" (2017)
 "Toxic Brother" (2020)
 "Crystals in the Sky" (2020)
 "Love Your Smell" (2020)
 "Screwed" (feat. Spiral Drive)(2021)

Videos 
 Mother's Cake – Realitricked Me
 GoTV hosted by Mother's Cake

External links 
Official Website
Mother's Cake on Bandcamp

References 

Austrian alternative rock groups
Austrian progressive rock groups
Hard rock musical groups
Funk rock musical groups
Musical groups established in 2008
Austrian musical trios
2008 establishments in Austria